Only on the Rhine is a 1930 German comedy film directed by Max Mack and starring Daisy D'Ora, Igo Sym, and Truus Van Aalten.

The film's sets were designed by Otto Erdmann and Hans Sohnle. Some location filming took place at Bacharach and Koblenz on the river Rhine.

Cast

References

Bibliography

External links 
 

1930 films
1930 comedy films
Films of the Weimar Republic
German comedy films
1930s German-language films
Films directed by Max Mack
Films scored by Fred Raymond
German black-and-white films
1930s German films